Metropolitan is a 1990 American romantic comedy-drama film and the debut of director and screenwriter Whit Stillman. The film concerns the lives of a group of wealthy young socialites during debutante season in Manhattan. In addition to some of their debutante parties, it covers their frequent informal after-hours gatherings at a friend's Upper East Side apartment, where they discuss life, philosophy and their fate; form attachments, romances and intrigues; and react to an interesting but less well-to-do newcomer. Metropolitan was nominated for Best Original Screenplay at the 63rd Academy Awards. The film is often considered the first of a trilogy of Stillman films, followed by Barcelona (1994, but written before Metropolitan) and The Last Days of Disco (1998).

Plot
Middle-class Princeton student Tom Townsend, an admirer of Charles Fourier, attends a debutante dress ball one evening on a whim. After the ball, a mix-up leads to his meeting a small group of young Upper East Side socialites known as the Sally Fowler Rat Pack, after the girl whose apartment they use for after-hours parties. Believing that they accidentally stole a taxi from Tom, they decide to invite him to their after-hours party, to prevent ill feelings.

Tom decides to attend the party, and befriends several other attendees, including Nick Smith, a cynic who takes Tom under his wing; Audrey, a shy girl who enjoys Regency-era literature and develops a crush on Tom; and Charlie, an overly philosophical friend with an unrequited love for Audrey. Tom learns that he and the Rat Pack have some common friends, including his ex-girlfriend Serena Slocum, with whom he remains infatuated.

Under Nick's tutelage, Tom ingratiates himself to the Rat Pack and soon becomes a full-fledged member. Much of the film is composed of dialogues in which Tom and the Rat Pack discuss the nebulous social scene they occupy, including how they are coming of age just as the culture in which they were raised is ending, leaving them with uncertain social futures. During these discussions, Tom reveals that he, too, was raised wealthy, but that his father abandoned the family to marry another woman, leaving Tom and his mother with limited financial resources. As a result, Tom harbors a love–hate relationship with wealth and the upper class.

Serena has been dating Rick Von Sloneker, a young, titled aristocrat notorious for his womanizing. At a party after the International Debutante Ball, Nick alienates himself from the group by accusing Rick of getting a girl drunk and convincing her to "pull a train" several years before, after which she committed suicide. Nick admits that the story was a "composite" of incidents from Rick's life, but insists that it was based on real events. Shortly thereafter, Nick leaves Manhattan, giving Tom his top hat as a token of friendship.

Believing that Tom is not interested in her romantically, Audrey decides to leave Manhattan to spend the rest of vacation in the Hamptons with Rick and another girl from the Rat Pack named Cynthia. Realizing that he has developed feelings for Audrey, Tom recruits Charlie to help him rescue her from Rick. The two travel to the Hamptons together, bonding en route. Against their expectations, they arrive to find Audrey in no peril. Tom and Charlie nonetheless instigate a fight with Rick, which ends with them being kicked out of his beach house. Afterward, Tom and Audrey talk on the beach, with Audrey saying that she is planning to attend college in France, and Tom contemplating going to visit her there. Tom, Audrey, and Charlie begin hitchhiking together towards Manhattan.

Cast

Production
Whit Stillman wrote the screenplay for Metropolitan between 1984 and 1988 while running an illustration agency in New York, and financed it by selling his apartment for $50,000, as well as with a few contributions from family members and friends. Including post-production, the total cost of making the film was $210,000. Stillman wanted to set the film in the past, possibly in the pre-Woodstock 1960s, but the budget did not allow for a strict period film to be made. Instead, he added period details to give the film an "aura of the past", like vintage Checker Cabs, and generally excluded anything too specific to the present day.

Themes
Leading commentators such as Emanuel Levy have called the film a comedy of manners while in her book Jane Austen and Co., Suzanne R. Pucci compares the film to Austen's novels and those of Henry James, such as The Wings of the Dove. For Pucci, the film deserves full membership in the class of 20th- and early 21st-century Austen remakes such as Ruby in Paradise (1993) and Bridget Jones's Diary (2001). According to her, the film tracks "the Austen phenomenon beyond Austen, into what [is called] the 'post-heritage' film, a kind of historical costume drama that uses the past in a deliberate or explicit way to explore current issues in cultural politics". In 2015, The New Yorker film critic Richard Brody wrote that Metropolitan is about the plight of America's upper class, or what the film's characters call the "urban haute bourgeoisie", and the "possibility—the necessity—and the difficulty of breaking out of their world and connecting with the wider world, for the benefit of the wider world". Mark Henrie, editor of the book Doomed Bourgeois in Love: Essays on the Films of Whit Stillman, writes that it is a conservative film, which uses "mocking affection, gentle irony, and a blizzard of witty dialogue" to bring us "to see what is admirable and necessary in the customs and conventions of America's upper class". In 2009, National Review named it the third-best conservative film.

Reception
On Rotten Tomatoes, the film holds an approval rating of 93% based on 41 reviews, with an average rating of 7.7/10. The site's critical consensus reads, "Metropolitan gently skewers the young socialite class with a smartly written dramedy whose unique, specific setting yields rich universal truths".

The film grossed $2.9 million in the United States and Canada and $7 million worldwide.

Accolades

Notes

References

Bibliography

External links

 
 
 
 
 
 
 Metropolitan: After the Ball, an essay by Lucy Sante at the Criterion Collection
 2015 interview featuring Whit Stillman, Carolyn Farina, and Dylan Hundley regarding Metropolitan

1990 films
1990 comedy-drama films
1990 directorial debut films
1990 independent films
1990s coming-of-age comedy-drama films
American coming-of-age comedy-drama films
American independent films
Films about the upper class
Films directed by Whit Stillman
Films set in Manhattan
Films shot in New York City
New Line Cinema films
1990s English-language films
1990s American films